Gilcimar Chaves Caetano or simply Gilcimar (born March 19, 1981) is a Brazilian football forward who currently plays for Audax Rio.

Gilcimar moved to China and signed a contract with Liaoning Whowin in July 2010. He made his Chinese Super League debut against Shenzhen Ruby on 28 July and scored his first goal for Liaoning in the 15th minute. He returned to Brazil and signed a contract with Duque de Caxias in 2011. In July 2012, he moved to Vila Nova on a free transfer.

References

Living people
1981 births
Brazilian expatriate footballers
Brazilian footballers
Expatriate footballers in the United Arab Emirates
Expatriate footballers in Poland
Brazilian expatriate sportspeople in Poland
Expatriate footballers in China
Brazilian expatriate sportspeople in China
Chinese Super League players
Campeonato Brasileiro Série B players
Campeonato Brasileiro Série C players
Campeonato Brasileiro Série D players
Zagłębie Lubin players
Madureira Esporte Clube players
Bangu Atlético Clube players
Mesquita Futebol Clube players
Nova Iguaçu Futebol Clube players
Esporte Clube Tigres do Brasil players
Duque de Caxias Futebol Clube players
Ipatinga Futebol Clube players
Liaoning F.C. players
Boavista Sport Club players
ABC Futebol Clube players
America Football Club (RJ) players
Associação Desportiva Cabofriense players
Artsul Futebol Clube players
Associação Atlética Portuguesa (RJ) players
Audax Rio de Janeiro Esporte Clube players
Grêmio Osasco Audax Esporte Clube players
Association football forwards
People from Itaperuna